In political studies, surveys have been conducted in order to construct historical rankings of the success of the presidents of the United States. Ranking systems are usually based on surveys of academic historians and political scientists or popular opinion. The scholarly rankings focus on presidential achievements, leadership qualities, failures and faults.
Popular-opinion polls typically focus on recent or well-known presidents.

General findings 
Abraham Lincoln, Franklin D. Roosevelt, and George Washington are most often listed as the three highest-rated presidents among historians. More recent presidents such as Ronald Reagan and Bill Clinton are often rated among the greatest in public opinion polls, but generally do not rank as highly among presidential scholars and historians. Because William Henry Harrison and James A. Garfield both died within their first year in office, they are often omitted from presidential rankings. Zachary Taylor died after serving as president for only 16 months, but he is usually included. In the case of these three presidents, it is not clear whether they received low rankings due to their actions as president or because each was in office for such a limited time that they did not accomplish much.

Political scientist Walter Dean Burnham noted the "dichotomous or schizoid profiles" of presidents, which can make some hard to classify. Historian Alan Brinkley stated that "there are presidents who could be considered both failures and great or near great (for example, Nixon)". Historian and political scientist James MacGregor Burns observed of Nixon: "How can one evaluate such an idiosyncratic president, so brilliant and so morally lacking?" It's also not clear that the absolute rankings mean much, especially for the middling presidents. Gerard Baker, US editor for The Times, writes, "the 42 American presidents fall into a well-established, Bell-curve or normal distribution on a chart – a handful of outstanding ones, a handful of duds, and a lot of so-sos. I couldn't, in all honesty therefore, really say that number 13 on the list is that much better than number 30."

History 

A 1948 poll was conducted by historian Arthur M. Schlesinger Sr. of Harvard University. A 1962 survey was also conducted by Schlesinger, who surveyed 75 historians. Schlesinger's son, Arthur M. Schlesinger Jr., conducted another poll in 1996.

The Complete Book of U.S. Presidents also gives the results of the 1982 survey, a poll of 49 historians conducted by the Chicago Tribune. A notable difference from the 1962 Schlesinger poll was the ranking of Dwight D. Eisenhower, which rose from 22nd in 1962 to 9th in 1982.

The 1996 column shows the results from a poll conducted from 1988 to 1996 by William J. Ridings Jr. and Stuart B. McIver and published in Rating The Presidents: A Ranking of U.S. Leaders, from the Great and Honorable to the Dishonest and Incompetent. More than 719 people took part in the poll, primarily academic historians and political scientists, although some politicians and celebrities also took part. Participants from every state were included and emphasis was placed upon getting input from female historians and "specialists in African American studies" as well as a few non-American historians. Poll respondents rated the presidents in five categories (leadership qualities, accomplishments, crisis management, political skill, appointments, and character and integrity) and the results were tabulated to create the overall ranking.

A 2000 survey by The Wall Street Journal consisted of an "ideologically balanced group of 132 prominent professors of history, law, and political science". This poll sought to include an equal number of liberals and conservatives in the survey as the editors argued that previous polls were dominated by either one group or the other. According to the editors, this poll included responses from more women, minorities, and young professors than the 1996 Schlesinger poll. The editors noted that the results of their poll were "remarkably similar" to the 1996 Schlesinger poll, with the main difference in the 2000 poll being the lower rankings for the 1960s presidents Lyndon B. Johnson and John F. Kennedy and higher ranking of President Ronald Reagan at 8th. Franklin D. Roosevelt still ranked in the top three.

Another presidential poll was conducted by The Wall Street Journal in 2005, with James Lindgren of Northwestern University Law School for the Federalist Society. As in the 2000 survey, the editors sought to balance the opinions of liberals and conservatives, adjusting the results "to give Democratic- and Republican-leaning scholars equal weight". Franklin D. Roosevelt still ranked in the top three, but editor James Taranto noted that Democratic-leaning scholars rated George W. Bush the sixth-worst president of all time while Republican scholars rated him the sixth-best, giving him a split-decision rating of "average".

The Siena College Research Institute has conducted surveys in 1982, 1990, 1994, 2002, 2010, 2018 and 2022 - during the second year of the first term of each president since Ronald Reagan. These surveys collect presidential rankings from historians, political scientists, and presidential scholars in a range of attributes, abilities, and accomplishments. The 1994 survey placed only two presidents, Franklin D. Roosevelt and Abraham Lincoln, above 80 points and two presidents, Andrew Johnson and Warren G. Harding, below 50 points.

A 2006 Siena College poll of 744 professors reported the following results:
 "George W. Bush has just finished five years as President. If today were the last day of his presidency, how would you rank him? The responses were: Great: 2%; Near Great: 5%; Average: 11%; Below Average: 24%; Failure: 58%"
 "In your judgment, do you think he has a realistic chance of improving his rating?" Two-thirds (67%) responded no; less than a quarter (23%) responded yes; and 10% chose "no opinion or not applicable"

Thomas Kelly, professor emeritus of American studies at Siena College, said: "President Bush would seem to have small hope for high marks from the current generation of practicing historians and political scientists. In this case, current public opinion polls actually seem to cut the President more slack than the experts do". Douglas Lonnstrom, Siena College professor of statistics and director of the Siena Research Institute, stated: "In our 2002 presidential rating, with a group of experts comparable to this current poll, President Bush ranked 23rd of 42 presidents. That was shortly after 9/11. Clearly, the professors do not think things have gone well for him in the past few years. These are the experts that teach college students today and will write the history of this era tomorrow".

In 2008, The Times daily newspaper of London asked eight of its own "top international and political commentators" to rank all 42 presidents "in order of greatness".

The C-SPAN Survey of Presidential Leadership consists of rankings from a group of presidential historians and biographers. The C-SPAN Survey of Presidential Leadership has taken place four times: in 2000, 2009, 2017, and 2021. The most recent survey was of 142 presidential historians, surveyed by C-SPAN's Academic Advisor Team, made up of Douglas G. Brinkley, Edna Greene Medford, Richard Norton Smith, and Amity Shlaes. In the survey, each historian rates each president on a scale of one ("not effective") to 10 ("very effective") on presidential leadership in ten categories: Public Persuasion, Crisis Leadership, Economic Management, Moral Authority, International Relations, Administrative Skills, Relations with Congress, Vision/Setting An Agenda, Pursued Equal Justice for All and Performance Within the Context of His Times—with each category equally weighed. The results of all four C-SPAN surveys have been fairly consistent. Abraham Lincoln has taken the highest ranking in each survey and George Washington, Franklin D. Roosevelt, and Theodore Roosevelt have always ranked in the top five while James Buchanan, Andrew Johnson, and Franklin Pierce have been ranked at the bottom of all four surveys.

The 2010 Siena poll of 238 presidential scholars found that former president George W. Bush was ranked 39th out of 43, with poor ratings in handling of the economy, communication, ability to compromise, foreign policy accomplishments, and intelligence. Meanwhile, the then-current president Barack Obama was ranked 15th out of 43, with high ratings for imagination, communication ability, and intelligence and a low rating for background (family, education, and experience).

In 2011, through the agency of its United States Presidency Centre (USPC), the Institute for the Study of the Americas (located in the University of London's School of Advanced Study) released the first ever United Kingdom academic survey to rate presidents. This polled the opinion of British specialists in American history and politics to assess presidential performance. They also gave an interim assessment of Barack Obama, but his unfinished presidency was not included in the survey. (Had he been included, he would have attained eighth place overall.)

In 2012, Newsweek magazine asked a panel of historians to rank the ten best presidents since 1900. The results showed that historians had ranked Franklin D. Roosevelt, Theodore Roosevelt, Lyndon B. Johnson, Woodrow Wilson, Harry S. Truman, John F. Kennedy, Dwight D. Eisenhower, Bill Clinton, Ronald Reagan, and Barack Obama as the best since that year.

A 2013 History News Network poll of 203 American historians, when asked to rate Obama's presidency on an A–F scale, gave him a B- grade. Obama, whom historians graded using 15 separate measures plus an overall grade, was rated most highly in the categories of communication ability, integrity, and crisis management; and most poorly for his relationship with Congress, transparency, and accountability.

A 2015 poll administered by the American Political Science Association (APSA) among political scientists specializing in the American presidency had Abraham Lincoln in the top spot, with George Washington, Franklin D. Roosevelt, Theodore Roosevelt, Thomas Jefferson, Harry S. Truman, Dwight D. Eisenhower, Bill Clinton, Andrew Jackson, and Woodrow Wilson making the top 10. APSA conducted a repeat of this poll in 2018, with Donald Trump appearing for the first time, in last position.

A 2016 survey of 71 British specialists by the Presidential History Network produced similar results to the 2011 USPC survey, with Barack Obama placed in the first quartile.

The 2018 Siena poll of 157 presidential scholars reported George Washington, Franklin D. Roosevelt, Abraham Lincoln, Theodore Roosevelt, and Thomas Jefferson as the top five US presidents, with SCRI director Don Levy stating, "The top five, Mount Rushmore plus FDR, is carved in granite with presidential historians...." Donald Trump—entering the SCRI survey for the first time—joined Andrew Johnson, James Buchanan, Warren G. Harding, and Franklin Pierce among the bottom five US presidents. George W. Bush, whom presidential scholars had rated among the bottom five in the previous 2010 survey, improved in position to the bottom of the third quartile. A 2021 C-SPAN poll continued a recent rehabilitation of Ulysses Grant, with Bush improving yet again, Obama remaining high and Trump near the bottom.

Scholar survey summary 
Within each column
 Blue  backgrounds indicate rankings in the first quartile.
 Green  backgrounds indicate rankings in the second quartile.
  Yellow-green backgrounds indicate the median ranking of an odd number of presidents.
 Yellow  backgrounds indicate rankings in the third quartile.
 Orange  backgrounds indicate rankings in the fourth quartile.
Note: click the "sort" icon at the head of each column to view the rankings for each survey in numerical order.

Notable scholar surveys

Murray–Blessing 1982 survey 
The Murray–Blessing 1982 survey asked historians whether they were liberal or conservative on domestic, social, and economic issues. The table below shows that the two groups had only small differences in ranking the best and worst presidents. Both groups agreed on the composition of nine of the top ten presidents (and were split over the inclusion of either Lyndon B. Johnson or Dwight D. Eisenhower) and six of the worst seven (split over Jimmy Carter or Calvin Coolidge).

Siena College Research Institute, 5th Presidential Expert Poll  1982 - 2010 
Abbreviations
Bg = Background
PL = Party leadership
CAb = Communication ability
RC = Relations with Congress
CAp = Court appointments
HE = Handling of economy
L = Luck
AC = Ability to compromise
WR = Willing to take risks
EAp = Executive appointments
OA = Overall ability
Im = Imagination
DA = Domestic accomplishments
Int = Integrity
EAb = Executive ability
FPA = Foreign policy accomplishments
LA = Leadership ability
IQ = Intelligence
AM = Avoid crucial mistakes
EV = Experts' view
O = Overall
 Blue  backgrounds indicate first quartile.
 Green  backgrounds indicate second quartile.
  Yellow-green backgrounds indicate the median.
 Yellow  backgrounds indicate third quartile.
 Orange  backgrounds indicate fourth quartile.
Source:

2011 USPC UK Survey of US Presidents 
In September/October 2010, the United States Presidency Centre (USPC) of the Institute for the Study of the Americas at the University of London surveyed 47 British specialists on American history and politics. Presidents were rated from 1 to 10 in five categories:

 vision/agenda-setting: "did the president have the clarity of vision to establish overarching goals for his administration and shape the terms of policy discourse?"
 domestic leadership: "did the president display the political skill needed to achieve his domestic objectives and respond effectively to unforeseen developments?" 
 foreign policy leadership: "was the president an effective leader in promoting US foreign policy interests and national security?" 
 moral authority: "did the president uphold the moral authority of his office through his character, values, and conduct?"
 positive historical significance of legacy: "did the president's legacy have positive benefits for America's development over time?"

William Henry Harrison (1841) and James Garfield (1881) were not rated because they died shortly after taking office. Barack Obama (2009–) ranked 8th in interim ranking as of January 2011, but was not counted in the final results (and thus did not affect the rankings of other presidents) because he had yet to complete a term.

Franklin D. Roosevelt (1933–1945) came in first overall and in the categories of vision/agenda, domestic leadership, and foreign policy leadership. Washington came in first for moral authority; Lincoln for his legacy. Morgan believes it is likely that Roosevelt's ranking (which only marginally surpassed Lincoln's) rose because the poll was conducted during the worst economic troubles since the 1930s.

Of presidents since 1960, only Ronald Reagan and (in interim results) Barack Obama placed in the top ten; Obama was the highest-ranked president since Harry Truman (1945–1953). Most of the other recent presidents held middling positions, though George W. Bush placed in the bottom ten, the lowest-ranked president since Warren Harding (1921–1923). Lyndon Johnson (1963–1969) "would have been placed much higher in recognition of his civil rights achievement but for the corrosive effect of Vietnam on his foreign policy and moral authority scores." As with US polls, the bottom five (other than Harding) were president before and after the Civil War.

One of the more significant differences from American polls is the relatively low ranking of John F. Kennedy (1961–1963), who placed fifteenth. British academics "seemingly faulted JFK for the gap between his rhetoric and his substantive achievements as president."

Abbreviations
VSA = Vision/Setting an agenda
DL = Domestic leadership
FPL = Foreign-policy leadership
MA = Moral authority
HL = Historical legacy (positive significance of)
O = Overall
 Blue  backgrounds indicate first quartile.
 Green  backgrounds indicate second quartile.
 Yellow  backgrounds indicate third quartile.
 Orange  backgrounds indicate fourth quartile.

Each category is ranked according to its averaged numerical score (in parentheses). Source:

2016 PHN UK Survey of U.S. Presidents 
In 2016, the Presidential History Network surveyed 71 named British and Irish specialists. The questions were the same as in the USPC survey, which was directed by some of the same people. Some respondents did not rate presidents that they were not familiar with. The minimum number of responses (62) were for the rather obscure and inconsequential presidents Hayes, Arthur, Cleveland, and Benjamin Harrison. 69–70 rated all recent presidents, from FDR on.

 Abbreviations
 VSA = Vision/Setting an agenda
 DL = Domestic leadership
 FPL = Foreign-policy leadership
 MA = Moral authority
 HL = Historical legacy (positive significance of)
 O = Overall
  Blue  backgrounds indicate first quartile.
  Green  backgrounds indicate second quartile.
  Yellow-green backgrounds indicate the median.
  Yellow  backgrounds indicate third quartile.
  Orange  backgrounds indicate fourth quartile.

Each category is ranked according to its averaged numerical score. Source:

2017 C-SPAN Presidential Historians Survey 
Abbreviations
PP = Public persuasion
CL = Crisis leadership
EM = Economic management
MA = Moral authority
IR = International relations
AS = Administrative skills
RC = Relations with Congress
VSA = Vision/Setting an agenda
PEJ = Pursued equal justice for all
PCT = Performance within context of times
O = Overall
 Blue  backgrounds indicate first quartile.
 Green  backgrounds indicate second quartile.
  Yellow-green backgrounds indicate the median.
 Yellow  backgrounds indicate third quartile.
 Orange  backgrounds indicate fourth quartile.
Source:

Siena College Research Institute, Presidential Expert Poll of 2018 
On February 13, 2019, Siena released its sixth presidential poll.

The poll was initiated in 1982 and occurs one year into the term of each new president. It is currently a survey of 157 presidential scholars across a range of leadership parameters.

The ranking awarded the top five spots to George Washington, Franklin Roosevelt, Abraham Lincoln, Theodore Roosevelt, and Thomas Jefferson, in keeping with prior surveys. Washington had been ranked fourth in all previous surveys, and Franklin Roosevelt first.

(Note that the numbers below do not match the source where there are ties in the rankings. They have instead been counted as ties are in other polls (e.g. 26, 27, 27, 27, 30 rather than 26, 27, 27, 27, 28), so that all categories span the range 1–44.)

 Abbreviations
 Bg = Background
 Im = Imagination
 Int = Integrity
 IQ = Intelligence
 L = Luck
 WR = Willing to take risks
 AC = Ability to compromise
 EAb = Executive ability
 LA = Leadership ability
 CAb = Communication ability
 OA = Overall ability
 PL = Party leadership
 RC = Relations with Congress
 CAp = Court appointments
 HE = Handling of economy
 EAp = Executive appointments
 DA = Domestic accomplishments
 FPA = Foreign policy accomplishments
 AM = Avoid crucial mistakes
 EV = Experts' view
 O = Overall
  Blue  backgrounds indicate first quartile.
  Green  backgrounds indicate second quartile.
  Yellow  backgrounds indicate third quartile.
  Orange  backgrounds indicate fourth quartile.

2021 C-SPAN Presidential Historians Survey 
 Abbreviations
 PP = Public persuasion
 CL = Crisis leadership
 EM = Economic management
 MA = Moral authority
 IR = International relations
 AS = Administrative skills
 RC = Relations with Congress
 VSA = Vision/Setting an agenda
 PEJ = Pursued equal justice for all
 PCT = Performance within context of times
 O = Overall
  Blue  backgrounds indicate first quartile.
  Green  backgrounds indicate second quartile.
  Yellow  backgrounds indicate third quartile.
  Orange  backgrounds indicate fourth quartile.
Source:

Siena College Research Institute, Presidential Expert Poll of 2022 
The Siena College Research Institute released their seventh poll results on June 22, 2022. The best and worst 10% remain unchanged from their 2018 poll (top five: F. D. Roosevelt, Lincoln, Washington, T. Roosevelt, Jefferson; bottom five: Andrew Johnson, Buchanan, Trump, Harding, Pierce). 41% of the scholars polled said that if a president were to be added to Mount Rushmore, it should be FDR. 63% believed that the president should be elected by a national popular vote, versus 17% support for the Electoral College.

A year into his term, Joe Biden entered the ranking in the second quartile, at No. 19 out of 45. Among recent presidents, George H. W. Bush, Bill Clinton and Barack Obama moved up in the rankings, while George W. Bush and Donald Trump moved down, though part of the downward shift was due to the addition of a new president to the poll; counting from the other direction, Trump remained unchanged at third place from last. The changes were relatively small (one or two places), apart from Obama, who moved up six places (14%) to No. 11, in the first quartile. Notable shifts among earlier presidents included the continuing rehabilitation of Lyndon Johnson, up 8 places into the first quartile, and of Ulysses Grant, up 3 places (up 8 in the individual evaluations) into the second quartile; and the lessening appreciation of Andrew Jackson, down 4 places to the median (down 7, into the third quartile, in the individual evaluations); Ronald Reagan, down 5 places, remaining in the second quartile; and Zachary Taylor, down 6 places into the fourth quartile.

 Abbreviations
 Bg = Background (family, education, experience)
 Im = Imagination
 Int = Integrity
 IQ = Intelligence
 L = Luck
 WR = Willing to take risks
 AC = Ability to compromise
 EAb = Executive ability
 LA = Leadership ability
 CAb = Communication ability (speak, write)
 OA = Overall ability
 PL = Party leadership
 RC = Relationship with Congress
 CAp = Court appointments
 HE = Handling of U.S. economy
 EAp = Executive appointments
 DA = Domestic accomplishments
 FPA = Foreign policy accomplishments
 AM = Avoid crucial mistakes
 PV = Present overall view [the average ranking of the polled experts]
 O = Overall rank [the average of the individual parameters]

  Blue  backgrounds indicate first quartile.
  Green  backgrounds indicate second quartile.
  Yellow-green backgrounds indicate the median.
  Yellow  backgrounds indicate third quartile.
  Orange  backgrounds indicate fourth quartile.
Source: Siena College Research Institute: 2022 Survey of U.S. Presidents

Scholar surveys of diversity and racism

American Politics and the African American Quest for Universal Freedom polls (2002–2020)

Professors Hanes Walton Jr. and Robert Smith conducted a poll in 2002 for their book American Politics and the African American Quest for Universal Freedom, where 44 African-American political scientists and historians ranked presidents for their personal and institutional racism against their policies to counter racial subordination. The polls have been updated for subsequent editions of the book. The results (through Donald Trump) were as follows. Note that "white supremacist" refers to personal belief; the other categories refer to policy.

Northwestern Presidential Leadership on Diversity and Inclusion Survey (2019) 
In May 2019, Dr. Alvin Tillery of the Center for the Study of Diversity and Democracy at Northwestern University and Dr. Christina Greer of Fordham University "conducted a poll of 113 academic researchers and asked them to rate the 14 modern presidents on both their overall leadership and rhetoric on diversity and inclusion using a scale ranging from 0 to 100." Survey respondents were significantly more liberal than the national average, "with only 13 percent of the respondents describing themselves as either moderate, slightly conservative, or conservative."

Public opinion polls

2010 Gallup poll 
A Gallup poll taken on November 19–21, 2010, asked 1,037 Americans to say, based on what they know or remember about the nine most recent former presidents, whether they approve or disapprove of how each handled his job in office.

 John F. Kennedy (85% approval/10% disapproval)
 Ronald Reagan (74% approval/24% disapproval)
 Bill Clinton (69% approval/30% disapproval)
 George H. W. Bush (64% approval/34% disapproval)
 Gerald Ford (61% approval/26% disapproval)
 Jimmy Carter (52% approval/42% disapproval)
 Lyndon B. Johnson (49% approval/36% disapproval)
 George W. Bush (47% approval/51% disapproval)
 Richard Nixon (29% approval/65% disapproval)

2011 Gallup poll 
A Gallup poll about presidential greatness taken February 2–5, 2011, asked 1,015 American adults the following question: "Who do you regard as the greatest United States president?"
 Ronald Reagan (19%)
 Abraham Lincoln (14%)
 Bill Clinton (13%)
 John F. Kennedy (11%)
 George Washington (10%)
 Franklin Roosevelt (8%)
 Barack Obama (5%)
 Theodore Roosevelt (3%)
 Harry S. Truman (3%)
 George W. Bush (2%)
 Thomas Jefferson (2%)
 Jimmy Carter (1%)
 Dwight Eisenhower (1%)
 George H. W. Bush (1%)
 Andrew Jackson (<0.5%)
 Lyndon B. Johnson (<0.5%)
 Richard Nixon (<0.5%)

In addition, "Other" received 1%, "None" received 1% and "No opinion" received 5%.

Public Policy Polling 
A Public Policy Polling poll taken between September 8–11, 2011, asked 665 American voters, based on what they know or remember about the nine then-most recent former presidents, whether they hold favorable or unfavorable views of how each handled his job in office.

 John F. Kennedy (74% favorability/15% unfavorability)
 Ronald Reagan (60% favorability/30% unfavorability)
 Bill Clinton (62% favorability/34% unfavorability)
 George H. W. Bush (53% favorability/35% unfavorability)
 Gerald Ford (45% favorability/26% unfavorability)
 Jimmy Carter (45% favorability/43% unfavorability)
 Lyndon B. Johnson (36% favorability/39% unfavorability)
 George W. Bush (41% favorability/51% unfavorability)
 Richard Nixon (19% favorability/62% unfavorability)

Vision Critical/Angus Reid poll 
A Vision Critical/Angus Reid Public Opinion poll taken on February 18–19, 2011, asked 1,010 respondents about 11 former presidents plus the current president and whether each was a good or bad president.

 John F. Kennedy (80% approval/6% disapproval)
 Ronald Reagan (72% approval/16% disapproval)
 Bill Clinton (65% approval/24% disapproval)
 Dwight D. Eisenhower (61% approval/6% disapproval)
 Harry S. Truman (57% approval/7% disapproval)
 Jimmy Carter (47% approval/28% disapproval)
 George H. W. Bush (44% approval/38% disapproval)
 Barack Obama (41% approval/33% disapproval)
 Gerald Ford (37% approval/25% disapproval)
 Lyndon B. Johnson (33% approval/27% disapproval)
 George W. Bush (30% approval/55% disapproval)
 Richard Nixon (24% approval/54% disapproval)

2013 Gallup poll 
A Gallup poll taken November 7–10, 2013, asked 1,039 American adults the following question: "How do you think each of the following presidents will go down in history—as an outstanding president, above average, average, below average, or poor?".

2014 Quinnipiac poll 
A Quinnipiac University poll taken June 24–30, 2014, asked 1,446 American registered voters who they believed were the best and worst presidents since World War II.

2017 Quinnipiac poll 
Four years later, a Quinnipiac University poll taken January 20–25, 2017, asked 1,190 American voters who they believed were the best and worst presidents since World War II.

2017 Morning Consult poll 
Including President Donald Trump for the first time, a Morning Consult poll taken February 9–10, 2017, asked 1,791 American registered voters who they believed were the best and worst presidents since World War II.

2018 Quinnipiac poll 
A Quinnipiac University poll taken March 3–5, 2018, asked 1,122 American voters who they believed were the best and worst presidents since World War II.

2021 Gallup poll 
A Gallup poll taken January 4–15, 2021, asked 1,023 American adults the following question: "How do you think each of the following presidents will go down in history—as an outstanding president, above average, average, below average, or poor?"

Memorability of the presidents 
In November 2014, Henry L. Roediger III and K. Andrew DeSoto published a study in the journal Science asking research subjects to name as many presidents as possible. They reported data from three generations as well as from an online survey conducted . The percentage of participants in the online survey sample who could name each president was the following:

 Barack Obama (100%)
 Bill Clinton (96%)
 George W. Bush or George H. W. Bush (95%)
 George Washington (94%)
 Abraham Lincoln (88%)
 John F. Kennedy (83%)
 Richard Nixon (82%)
 Jimmy Carter (79%)
 Thomas Jefferson (72%)
 Ronald Reagan (66%)
 Gerald Ford (62%)
 Franklin D. Roosevelt or Theodore Roosevelt (60%)
 John Adams or John Quincy Adams (56%)
 Dwight D. Eisenhower (54%)
 Harry S. Truman (50%)
 Andrew Jackson (47%)
 Herbert Hoover (42%)
 Andrew Johnson or Lyndon B. Johnson (41%)
 William Howard Taft (39%)
 James Madison (38%)
 Ulysses S. Grant (38%)
 James Monroe (30%)
 Woodrow Wilson (29%)
 Calvin Coolidge (22%)
 James A. Garfield (19%)
 James K. Polk (17%)
 Warren G. Harding (16%)
 William McKinley (15%)
 John Tyler (12%)
 James Buchanan (12%)
 Grover Cleveland (11%)
 William Henry Harrison or Benjamin Harrison (11%)
 Martin Van Buren (11%)
 Rutherford B. Hayes (10%)
 Zachary Taylor (10%)
 Millard Fillmore (8%)
 Franklin Pierce (7%)
 Chester A. Arthur (7%)

Criticism 
David Herbert Donald, noted biographer of Abraham Lincoln, relates that when he met John F. Kennedy in 1961, Kennedy voiced his deep dissatisfaction and resentment with historians who had rated some of his predecessors. Kennedy remarked, "No one has a right to grade a president—even poor James Buchanan—who has not sat in his chair, examined the mail and information that came across his desk, and learned why he made his decisions." Historian and political scientist Julian E. Zelizer has argued that traditional presidential rankings explain little concerning actual presidential history and that they are "weak mechanisms for evaluating what has taken place in the White House." The broadly static nature of the rankings over multiple decades has also been called into question, particularly given the frequent exposure of previously unknown material about American government.

In 2002, Ron Walters, former director of the University of Maryland's African American Leadership Institute, stated that ranking based on the presidents' ability to balance the interests of the majority and those of excluded groups was practical in respect to American debate on racial politics. Presidents have traditionally been ranked on personal qualities and their leadership ability to solve problems that move the nation in a positive direction. Walters stated that there was a qualitative difference between presidential evaluations from white and African-American intellectuals. He gives as an example of this difference a comparison between two contemporary studies, a 1996 New York Times poll by Arthur M. Schlesinger Jr., where 31 white historians and one black historian ranked presidents as "Great", "Near Great", "High Average", "Average", "Below Average", or "Failure", and a survey performed by professors Hanes Walton Jr. and Robert Smith and featured in their book American Politics and the African American Quest for Universal Freedom, where 44 African-American political scientists and historians ranked presidents as "White Supremacist", "Racist", "Racially Neutral", "Racially Ambivalent", or "Antiracist".

A 2012 analysis by Mark Zachary Taylor faulted presidential surveys with "partisan bias and subjective judgments", suggesting an algorithm to rank of the presidents based on objectively measurable economic statistics. The results placed Franklin Roosevelt as the best president for the economy, followed by Harding, Hayes and McKinley tied for second. The worst-ranked presidents were Hoover and Van Buren, tied.

A common criticism of presidential surveys is that participants are "driven by liberal bias to give high ratings to presidents who expanded the role of government." The first British survey, published in 2011, places some small government advocates higher than recent US surveys have: Thomas Jefferson at 4, Ronald Reagan at 8, and Andrew Jackson at 9 (compare 7, 10 and 13 in C-SPAN 2009).

Alvin S. Felzenberg, a professor at both the Elliot School of International Affairs at George Washington University and the Annenberg School for Communication at the University of Pennsylvania, is one of those who has criticized what he sees as a liberal bias in presidential rankings. In particular, he ranks Ronald Reagan in third place, substantially higher than averaged rankings. In his 2010 review of Felzenberg's 2008 book The Leaders We Deserved (and a Few We Didn't), Michael Genovese says, "Felzenberg is upset—with some justification—at the liberal bias he sees as so prevalent in the ranking of U.S. presidents by historians and political scientists. To remedy this, he has provided a counter to the liberal bias with a conservative bias. In doing so, he commits all the sins of which he accuses liberals. This book is a mirror image of the work he finds so troubling....It is unscientific, impressionistic, and highly subjective."

See also 

 Historical rankings of chancellors of Germany
 Historical rankings of prime ministers of Australia
 Historical rankings of prime ministers of Canada
 Historical rankings of prime ministers of the Netherlands
 Historical rankings of prime ministers of the United Kingdom

References

Further reading 

  → A non-quantitative appraisal by leading historian.
  → A collection of essays by presidential scholars.
  → Contains the results of the 1962 and 1982 surveys.
 
 
 
 Greenstein, Fred I. et al. Evolution of the modern presidency : a bibliographical survey (1977) bibliography and annotation of 2500 scholarly books and articles. online
 
 Merry, Robert W. Where They Stand: The American Presidents in the Eyes of Voters and Historians  (2012).
 
 
 
 
 
 
 
 
 
  → For Federalist Society surveys.

External links 
 "Ranking Presidents: Utter Nonsense or Useful Analysis?" 2001 column by John Dean.

United States
Lists relating to the United States presidency
Presidency of the United States
United States presidential history